William Henry Enochs (March 29, 1842 – July 13, 1893) was a U.S. Representative from Ohio.

Biography
Born near Middleburg, Ohio, Enochs attended the common schools and Ohio University at Athens. When the American Civil War began he enlisted as a Private in Company B, 2nd Ohio Infantry, April 17, 1861.
Later he served as colonel of the 1st West Virginia Infantry and was brevetted brigadier general of Volunteers March 13, 1865.

After the war ended Enochs studied at the Cincinnati Law School, graduating in 1866. He was admitted to the bar and practiced law in Ironton, Ohio. He also became a member of the State house of representatives in 1870 and 1871.

Enochs was elected as a Republican to the Fifty-second and Fifty-third Congresses and served from March 4, 1891, until his death in Ironton, Ohio, July 13, 1893.

He was interred in Arlington National Cemetery with his wife Annis Hamilton Enochs.

See also
List of United States Congress members who died in office (1790–1899)

Sources

1842 births
1893 deaths
Republican Party members of the United States House of Representatives from Ohio
People from Noble County, Ohio
Ohio University alumni
Union Army colonels
University of Cincinnati College of Law alumni
Burials at Arlington National Cemetery
Republican Party members of the Ohio House of Representatives
Ohio lawyers
People of Ohio in the American Civil War
19th-century American politicians
People from Ironton, Ohio
19th-century American lawyers